Chalet d’Asdonck is the name of a country house in the Belgian city of Leopoldsburg. More precisely, the house is situated in Immert, which is alternatively known as Asdonkerheide, the Asdonk Heath. The building itself dates from ca 1900.

The Chalet d’Asdonck was formerly the main residence of a general in the Belgian army. The original owner of the land was Edouard-Charles Henrard, an officer in the army and professor at the Brussels Military Academy, the École Royale Militaire. Mr Henrard bought the land in 1898 from the city of Leopoldsburg (formerly known as Bourg St Leopold) and set out to build a villa for himself and his spouse, Anne-Petrouille Dobbelaere.

The land, more than 65 hectares including a homestead, was purchased for 12.000 Belgian francs, the currency of the time. Nowadays the equivalent would be 300 euros.

On this land a sizable country house was constructed. Soon after a landscaping project was carried out, to create a park around the house, including a forest and pond.

In the present day, the house and park still remain. After some years of neglect, the house itself was renovated by its current owners, entrepreneur Ludo Gielen and his wife Nathalie Riga. Also, the park and forest were restored to their original design.

Architecture in Belgium